Hennadii Boiko (born 3 March 1974) is a Paralympic swimmer from Ukraine competing mainly in category S1 events at the 2012 and 2016 Summer Paralympics.

Hennadii Boiko - Athlete Bio

References

Paralympic swimmers of Ukraine
Swimmers at the 2012 Summer Paralympics
Swimmers at the 2016 Summer Paralympics
Paralympic gold medalists for Ukraine
Medalists at the 2012 Summer Paralympics
Medalists at the 2016 Summer Paralympics
Ukrainian male backstroke swimmers
Living people
1974 births
S1-classified Paralympic swimmers
Sportspeople from Mykolaiv
Paralympic medalists in swimming